There are 59 mammal species in Bosnia and Herzegovina, of which one is endangered, eight are vulnerable, and two are near threatened.

The following tags are used to highlight each species' conservation status as assessed by the International Union for Conservation of Nature:

Some species were assessed using an earlier set of criteria. Species assessed using this system have the following instead of near threatened and least concern categories:

Order: Rodentia (rodents) 

Rodents make up the largest order of mammals, with over 40% of mammalian species. They have two incisors in the upper and lower jaw which grow continually and must be kept short by gnawing. Most rodents are small though the capybara can weigh up to 45 kg (100 lb).

Suborder: Sciurognathi
Family: Sciuridae (squirrels)
Subfamily: Sciurinae
Tribe: Sciurini
Genus: Sciurus
 Red squirrel, Sciurus vulgaris LC
Subfamily: Xerinae
Tribe: Marmotini
Genus: Marmota
 Alpine marmot, Marmota marmota LR/lc
Family: Gliridae (dormice)
Subfamily: Leithiinae
Genus: Dryomys
 Forest dormouse, Dryomys nitedula LR/nt
Genus: Eliomys
 Garden dormouse, Eliomys quercinus VU
Genus: Muscardinus
 Hazel dormouse, Muscardinus avellanarius LR/nt
Subfamily: Glirinae
Genus: Glis
 European edible dormouse Glis glis LR/nt
Family: Spalacidae
Subfamily: Spalacinae
Genus: Nannospalax
 Lesser mole rat, Nannospalax leucodon VU
Family: Cricetidae
Subfamily: Arvicolinae
Genus: Arvicola
 Water vole, Arvicola terrestris LR/lc
Genus: Chionomys
 Snow vole, Chionomys nivalis LR/nt
Genus: Clethrionomys
 Bank vole, Clethrionomys glareolus LR/lc
Genus: Cricetus
 European hamster, C. cricetus  presence uncertain
Genus: Dinaromys
 Balkan snow vole, Dinaromys bogdanovi LR/nt
Genus: Microtus
 Field vole, Microtus agrestis LR/lc
 Common vole, Microtus arvalis LR/lc
 European pine vole, Microtus subterraneus LR/lc
 Thomas's pine vole, Microtus thomasi LR/nt
Family: Muridae (mice, rats, voles, gerbils, hamsters, etc.)
Subfamily: Murinae
Genus: Apodemus
 Striped field mouse, Apodemus agrarius LR/lc
 Yellow-necked mouse, Apodemus flavicollis LR/lc
 Broad-toothed field mouse, Apodemus mystacinus LR/lc
 Wood mouse, Apodemus sylvaticus LC
Genus: Micromys
 Harvest mouse, Micromys minutus LR/nt
Genus: Mus
 Steppe mouse, Mus spicilegus LR/nt
Family: Castoridae (beavers)
Genus: Castor
 Eurasian beaver, C. fiber

Order: Lagomorpha (lagomorphs) 

The lagomorphs comprise two families, Leporidae (hares and rabbits), and Ochotonidae (pikas). Though they can resemble rodents, and were classified as a superfamily in that order until the early 20th century, they have since been considered a separate order. They differ from rodents in a number of physical characteristics, such as having four incisors in the upper jaw rather than two.

Family: Leporidae (rabbits, hares)
Genus: Lepus
European hare, L. europaeus

Order: Soricomorpha (shrews, moles, and solenodons) 

The "shrew-forms" are insectivorous mammals. The shrews and solenodons closely resemble mice while the moles are stout-bodied burrowers.
Family: Soricidae (shrews)
Subfamily: Crocidurinae
Genus: Crocidura
 Bicolored shrew, C. leucodon 
Lesser white-toothed shrew, C. suaveolens 
Subfamily: Soricinae
Tribe: Nectogalini
Genus: Neomys
 Southern water shrew, N. anomalus 
 Eurasian water shrew, N. fodiens 
Tribe: Soricini
Genus: Sorex
 Alpine shrew, S. alpinus 
 Common shrew, S. araneus

Order: Chiroptera (bats) 

The bats' most distinguishing feature is that their forelimbs are developed as wings, making them the only mammals capable of flight. Bat species account for about 20% of all mammals.
Family: Vespertilionidae
Subfamily: Myotinae
Genus: Myotis
Bechstein's bat, M. bechsteini 
Long-fingered bat, M. capaccinii 
Pond bat, M. dasycneme 
Geoffroy's bat, M. emarginatus 
Subfamily: Vespertilioninae
Genus: Barbastella
Western barbastelle, B. barbastellus 
Genus: Nyctalus
Greater noctule bat, N. lasiopterus 
Lesser noctule, N. leisleri 
Genus: Pipistrellus
 Common pipistrelle, Pipistrellus pipistrellus LC
Genus: Plecotus
Brown long-eared bat, P. auritus 
Alpine long-eared bat, P. macrobullaris 
Subfamily: Miniopterinae
Genus: Miniopterus
Common bent-wing bat, M. schreibersii 
Family: Rhinolophidae
Subfamily: Rhinolophinae
Genus: Rhinolophus
Blasius's horseshoe bat, R. blasii 
Mediterranean horseshoe bat, R. euryale 
Greater horseshoe bat, R. ferrumequinum 
Lesser horseshoe bat, R. hipposideros 
Mehely's horseshoe bat, R. mehelyi

Order: Cetacea (whales) 

The order Cetacea includes whales, dolphins and porpoises. They are the mammals most fully adapted to aquatic life with a spindle-shaped nearly hairless body, protected by a thick layer of blubber, and forelimbs and tail modified to provide propulsion underwater.

Suborder: Odontoceti
Superfamily: Platanistoidea
Family: Delphinidae (marine dolphins)
Genus: Delphinus
 Short-beaked common dolphin, D. delphis 
Genus: Grampus
 Risso's dolphin, G. griseus

Order: Carnivora (carnivorans) 

There are over 260 species of carnivorans, the majority of which feed primarily on meat. They have a characteristic skull shape and dentition. 
Suborder: Feliformia
Family: Felidae (cats)
Subfamily: Felinae
Genus: Felis
European wildcat, F. silvestris  
Family: Herpestidae
Genus: Urva
 Small Indian mongoose, U. auropunctata  introduced
Suborder: Caniformia
Family: Canidae (dogs, foxes)
Genus: Canis
Golden jackal, C. aureus 
European jackal, C. a. moreoticus
 Gray wolf, C. lupus  
Genus: Vulpes
Red fox, V. vulpes 
Family: Ursidae (bears)
Genus: Ursus
Brown bear, U. arctos  
Family: Mustelidae (mustelids)
Genus: Lutra
European otter, L. lutra 
Genus: Martes
Beech marten, M. foina 
Genus: Meles
European badger, M. meles 
Genus: Mustela
Stoat, M. erminea 
Least weasel, M. nivalis 
European polecat, M. putorius 
Family: Phocidae (earless seals)
Genus: Monachus
 Mediterranean monk seal, M. monachus  extirpated

Order: Artiodactyla (even-toed ungulates) 

The even-toed ungulates are ungulates whose weight is borne about equally by the third and fourth toes, rather than mostly or entirely by the third as in perissodactyls. There are about 220 artiodactyl species, including many that are of great economic importance to humans.
Family: Suidae (pigs)
Subfamily: Suinae
Genus: Sus
 Wild boar, S. scrofa 
Family: Cervidae (deer)
Subfamily: Cervinae
Genus: Cervus
 Red deer, C. elaphus 
Genus: Dama
 European fallow deer, D. dama 
Subfamily: Capreolinae
Genus: Capreolus
 Roe deer, C. capreolus

See also
List of chordate orders
Lists of mammals by region
List of prehistoric mammals
Mammal classification
List of mammals described in the 2000s

Notes

References
 

Bosnia and Herzegovina
Mammals
Mammals
Bosnia and Herzegovina